Campichoeta are a genus of flies, and are in the family Diastatidae.

Species
C. fumigata Duda, 1934
C. grandiloba McAlpine, 1962
C. griseola (Zetterstedt, 1855)
C. obscuripennis (Meigen, 1830)
C. punctum (Meigen, 1830)
C. zernyi Duda, 1934

References

Diastatidae
Ephydroidea genera
Taxa named by Pierre-Justin-Marie Macquart